The 1930 Loyola Ramblers football team was an American football team that represented Loyola University Chicago as an independent during the 1930 college football season. Led by Edwin J. Norton in his only season as head coach, the Ramblers compiled an overall record of 2–6–1. Dr. Norton was hired as head coach after serving for the previous three years as an assistant at Loyola.

In December, university president Rev. Robert M. Kelley announced intercollegiate football at Loyola was to be abandoned and only offered as an intermural sport. This announcement made the 1930 Ramblers season the final one in program history.

Schedule

References

Loyola
Loyola Ramblers football seasons
Loyola Ramblers football